Wireless Display (WiDi) is technology developed by Intel that enables users to stream music, movies, photos, videos and apps without cables from a compatible computer to a compatible HDTV or through the use of an adapter with other HDTVs or computer monitors. Intel WiDi supports HD 1080p video quality, 5.1 surround sound, and low latency for interacting with applications sent to the TV from a PC.

Using the Intel WiDi Widget, users can perform different functions simultaneously on their PC and TV such as checking email on the PC while streaming a movie to the TV from the same device.

WiDi development was discontinued in 2015 in favor of Miracast, a standard developed by the Wi-Fi Alliance and natively supported by Windows 8.1 and later. In Microsoft's Windows 10 operating system, the built-in Wireless Display is called Project, which can be used to mirror the device's display to a TV if it supports Miracast.

Version history
 2010 - WiDi 1.0 - Supports 720p
 2011 - WiDi 2.0 - Supports 1080p
 2012 - WiDi 3.0 - Supports 1080p @ 60 FPS
 September 2012 - WiDi 3.5 - Supports Windows 8, touch functionality, 1080p output, 3D content, HDCP2, Blu-ray, and USB devices and Miracast.
 2013 - WiDi 4.0
 2014 - WiDi 4.1
 2014 - WiDi 4.2 - 5 GHz Wi-Fi support (with compatible receiver)
 2015 - WiDi 5.1 - Supports 4k - Ultra HD displays
 2015 - WiDi 6.0
 October 2015 - The marketing and development of WiDi applications was discontinued by Intel, who said that this was because the Miracast standard was natively supported in Windows for wireless display.

Miracast

The Miracast standard is supported in Intel Wireless Display versions 3.5 through 6.0, when it was discontinued. After this development, Intel recommended that business users utilize Intel Unite as a platform for collaboration. Miracast was included in Android 4.2 smart phones and onwards and on Windows 8.1 and 10. It can stream on TVs, projectors, and media players.

See also
 AirPlay
 Chromecast
 Digital Living Network Alliance (DLNA)
 DisplayLink
 Google Cast
 Matter Casting
 Mobile High-Definition Link - MHL
 SlimPort (Mobility DisplayPort), also known as MyDP
 Ultra-wideband
 Wireless HDMI:
 WiGig
 WirelessHD
 Wireless Home Digital Interface
 Wi-Fi Direct

References

External links 

 WiDi at Intel.com
 The Main Wireless HDMI Transmission Protocols and Their Typical Products Comparison of different wireless HDMI transmission protocols at Portablehifi.com

Computer display standards
Intel products
Wi-Fi
Wi-Fi Direct
Wireless display technologies